Chundikuli (Cundikuli) is a suburb of the city of Jaffna in northern Sri Lanka. Chundikuli means "the pond of the cunti plant" in Tamil and is derived from the Tamil words cunti (several aquatic plants from the mimosa genus) and kuli (pond). The suburb is divided into two village officer divisions (Chundikuli North and Chundikuli South) whose combined population was 3,618 at the 2012 census.

Schools
 Chundikuli Girls' College

References

Jaffna DS Division
Suburbs of Jaffna